Portuguese Volleyball Third Division

The Portuguese Volleyball Third Division is the Third-level men's Volleyball League in Portugal, which is also called (Portuguese: "3a Divisão de Voleibol").
The competition is organized by the Federação Portuguesa de Voleibol.

Portuguese 3rd Division Champions

References

http://www.fpvoleibol.pt/campeoesnacionais.php

Third Division, Portuguese Volleyball